Janjgir is the headquarters of the Janjgir–Champa district in Chhattisgarh, India. It has been the district headquarters since 25 May 1998, when Janjgir–Champa was carved out of Bilaspur. Well known for its Vishnu Temple aka Nakta Mandir,Nahariya Baba Mandir, Agricultural industries, and Rice production, Janjgir is undergoing rapid industrial development and will become home to various industries and plants in the coming years, city's railway station name is Janjgir-Naila. Janjgir is well connected by railways and roads and is connected to major cities like Bilaspur and Raipur through National Highway 149.

Janjgir city belongs to Nawagarh (Janjgir) Block. Its tehsil is Janjgir and sub division is Janjgir too. 

Janjgir is also known for its educational B.Ed. colleges, Nursing colleges and ITIs... Janjgir is well known for crop production, especially rice. Main industries in Janjgir are Marwa Thermal Power Plant, Wheat floor product, Engineering industry and some small rural industries including Rural insdustrial parks. Every year the city organises "Jajwalya Dev Lok Mahotsav and AgriTech Agricultural fair", a cultural programme devoted to King Jajwalya, who was founder of the city and ruled the Kalchuri empire in ancient times. He was the most powerful and famous king of Kalchuri dynasty. He defeated Bastar Som Emperor Someshwar Dev. He also dedeated Odisha's Gang dynasty's king. He owned the title "Gaj Shardul" means Hunter/owner of Elephants. 
AgriTech fair is for local as well as other farmers, you can find stalls on new agricultural techniques, new farming techniques, new breeds of crops, vegetables as well as animals cows, buffalos, goats, cocks-hens birds. Mining deptt also show samples of ores and minerals such as iron, coal, copper, tin, talc, dolomite, limestone, bauxite and many more.

Places of interest in Janjgir include the deserted ruins of the residence of Miss A. C. Funk, a Christian missionary who lost her life aboard the Titanic and the Nahariya Baba Temple(a temple dedicated to Lord Hanuman), Bawan bari Fort, BaramBawa Choura, Vishal Vishnu Mandir also knows as Nakta mandir, Small Vishnu mandir, ChandwaBaiga Mandir and Shree Shyam Prem Mandir. other places are Kohkhra (Mankadai Devi Temple), Madanpurgarh (Mankamai Devi temple), Pithampur (Famous Kaleshwar Nath Shivlinga), Sendhwar,  KotmiSonar (【【Crocodile Park】】, Dalha Pahad (famous for Nag Panchami's fair). Natural places to visits are Bhima Talab, Madanpur, Hasdeo River bank, Kudri Dam, Goaband.

Police station of Janjgir is City kotwali Janjgir, there is a police chowki in Naila too.

Post Office of Janjgir is Janjgir Head Post office, where you can get banking facility of IPPB too.

there are many banks' branches here including State Bank of India, Punjab National Bank, Union  Bank of India, Bank Of Baroda, Bank of Maharshtra, District Cooperative Bank, Chhattisgarh Gramin Bank, ICICI bank, HDFC bank, Equitas Bank, Bandhan Bank, Kotak Mahindra Bank, UCO Bank, Central Bank of India, IndusInd Bank, AU small finance bank, DCB bank and some other small finance banks

Demographics 
As of 2011 India census, Janjgir had a population of nearly 41000. Males constitute 52% of the population and females 48%. Janjgir has an average literacy rate of 70%, higher than the national average of 59.5%: male literacy is 59%, and female literacy is 60%. In Janjgir, 14% of the population is under 6 years of age.

The city has a multicultural mix of locals and people that have migrated from Sindh, Punjab, Uttarakhand,
Uttar Pradesh, Bihar, Madhya Pradesh, Rajasthan, West Bengal, Andhra Pradesh, Haryana, Maharashtra and Gujarat, etc. The main languages spoken are Chhattisgarhi and Hindi, while Sindhi and English are spoken by only a few.

Schools 
 Swami Atmanand Hindi medium school
 Swami Atmanand English Medium School
 Government Multi Handicapped School cum Hostel, Pendri, Janjgir
Government Boys Higher Secondary School Khokhra, Janjgir (CGBSE )
Gyanoday Convent School, Janjgir
Kendriya Vidyalaya, Janjgir (CBSE)
 Brilliant Public School, Banari, Janjgir (CBSE)
Gurukul International School (CBSE)
Govt Multipurpose High. Sec. School-Boys School (CGBSE)
Gattani Girls High. Sec. School (CGBSE)
D.P.Kesharwani Higher Secondary School (CGBSE)
Delhi Public School (CBSE)
Gyanjyoti Higher Secondary School (CGBSE)
Saraswati Shishu Mandir (CGBSE)
Gyandeep Higher Secondary School (CGBSE)
Gyanbharati Higher Secondary School (CGBSE)
Vivekananda Model Convent School (CGBSE)
Navjyoti School
Vande Matram School (CGBSE)
St. Xaviers School (CBSE)
Hasdeo Public School (CBSE)
Hariram Gattani Memorial Jay Bharat English Medium School (CBSE)
Green River Valley School
Gyanodaya Higher Secondary School
Gurukul International School
Lotus Public School
Green River Valley School
Jigyasa School,
 Vidya Bharti School

Colleges 
Govt. Thakur Chhedilal Barrister P.G. College
 Govt. Law college
Govt. Agriculture College, Janjgir
Govt. Polytechnic College
Govt. P.G. College Janjgir
Govt. Jajwalya Dev new Girls College Janjgir
Govt. Krishi Vigyan Kendra Study and Reserch centre Janjgir
Govt. Industrial Training Institute
Govt. Pt. SundarLal Sharma (open) University study centre
AISECT College
B.Ed colleges
Pt Harishankar Shiksha Mahavidyalaya
Gyandeep Shiksha Mahavidyalaya
 GyanrRoshni B.Ed. college
Gyanodaya Shiksha Mahavidyalaya
Govt. District institute of Educational Training
Keshari Shikshan Samiti B.E.D College Khokhara (Janjgir)
D.B.M ITI 
 Surya Nursing college
 Harishankar Nursing College
 Dr C V Raman University Study centre
 Jagrani Devi ITI 
 Utkarsh B.Ed. College, Sarkhon, Janjgir

Religious Place

Vishnu Mandir 
Twist in the south of Chhattisgarh, Jajwly Kalchuri King Bhima Dev, first the edge of the pool was built a temple in the 11th century. The temple is a magnificent example of Indian architecture. Purwabhimuki temple, and is made up of Sptrth plan. Temple is just the top third plane. But not in time. The temple is at a high naturally.

Sculpture and crafts 
Around the temple are very beautiful and Alnkrnyukt Pratimao markings showing the development of contemporary sculpture. The Sanctuary of the goddess Ganga and Jamuna both sides of the entrance with the gatekeeper, Jai — Victory are located. In addition, as the Trinity of Brahma, Vishnu and Shiva statue. Grunasin statue of Lord Vishnu is situated right on it. In either pane of the temple naturally different — different view appears. Archer on a pane Rama, Sita, Laxman and Ravan and deer are engraved. Bhicshatn Ravana and Sita's abduction of the second pane of the scene. Deer killed by Sri Rama and Ravana temple of Sita's abduction by the entrance of the temple scene on both Parshvon two — two pairs of semi-column which is divided into two main sections. Lanbodar and triple-headed crown with the notation of Mammon. Mridngwadini at the pinnacle of the temple, men embrace siren, sword bearer, dancer Mnjugosha, Janjr plays Dewangnaaँ Hnsavli etc. are engraved. Apply kohl in the eyes of the northern leg of the temple Alsyukt Lilavati, Chanvrdhari Chamara, flute plays Vanshiwadini, Mridngwadini, mirrors, etc. Dewangnaan jurist put the dot is located. Wadini Saraswati veena in the south leg, hairstyle Gumfini, Lilavati, Hnsavli, Maninee, Chamara etc. are located Dewangnaaँ.

Temple of the northern, southern and western leg of the images recorded in different currencies seekers. In addition, the lower hole located in the northern leg of the statue and entrance face the music society's view of both sides is particularly noteworthy. Temple of the Sun Lord is seated in the rear. Broken statue of a hand, but the shoes Use chariot and seven horses are clear. Similarly, many of the sculptures are inlaid in the walls. The sculptures on the temple walls when the heart has been repaired. Have other artistic sculptures around the temple, including the marking of mainly dwarf Dshawataro of Lord Vishnu, Nrsih, are the idols of Krishna and Rama.Here's gorgeous and artistic depictions of the Ramayana Drishyo 10 to 15 get to see. Despite such a decoration in the sanctum sanctorum of the temple is a statue. This temple is lonely and is craving for a lamp.

Legend 
There are many legends about the temple building. According to a legend, a certain amount of time (some people call this Chhaimasi night) in the construction of the temple of Janjgir Shivrinarayan temple was in the competition. Lord Narayana had announced that a temple would be completed first, they will enter the same. Shivrinarayan before the temple was completed and entered into Lord Narayana. Janjgir temple was left unfinished forever. According to another legend, the temple including shifts in the competition has been reported. The story told in the nearby Shiva temple is the top part. Another legend is attached to the mighty Bhima, is also prevalent. It is said that the temple pond Bhim Bhima began running five times the shovel was dug. According to legend, Bhim is the architect of the temple. Accordingly, once a night in the temple of Bhima and Vishwakarma was making contest. Bhima then began the construction of the temple. During the temple of Bhim chisel  — hammer goes down then the elephant would bring it back. But once Bhim went into the pond near the chisel, the elephant and the morning were not revert. Bhim was very hurt and sorrow of losing the competition he has two pieces of elephant. The temple was left unfinished. Bhim and elephant statue in the temple complex today is fragmented. Vishnu Mandir was built by the kings of the Hayhay dynasty in the 12th century, but did not complete it. The temple was built in 2 phases. The temple is an incomplete temple which can be seen near Bhima Talab.

Hanuman temple 
It is famous temple and formally called Nahriya Baba Dham stay at Naila canal railway crossing.

Manka Dai Mandir 
The Manka Dai Mandir is a famous temple in janjgir. On discovering the idol, he started worshipping it and hence attracting public attention. it is situated in a nearby village khokhra. the temple is in only 5 km from janjgir.
Keshari B.Ed. College, Khokhra (Janjgir)

Transportation 
Janjgir is a connected with SEC railway and its railway station is Janjgir-Naila. It is well connected to the rest of the country through the Indian Railways. The station is on the main Mumbai-Kolkata (Calcutta) rail line with daily connections to Mumbai, Kolkata, Pune, Nagpur, Puri, Vishakhapattnam and Ahmedabad. It is also the originating station for daily trains to:
 Korba Kochuvali Express
 Chhattisgarh Express,
 Korba-Vishakhapattnam Express
 Hasdeo Express,
 Jandhatabdi Express, 
 Utkal Express
 Ahmadabad Express 
 Shalimar Express
 Shivnath Express
 Trivendram Express
 WainGanga Express
 Tata Itwari Express
 BSP Tatanagar Express
 Mumbai LTT Express

Details about railway stations 
There are 5 railway station in Janjgir listed below with approximate distance from the District Headquarters

• Janjgir-Naila

• Champa 9 km

• Akaltara 16 km;

The city is connected with Mumbai and Kolkata via Bilaspur, Raipur through the National Highway network. Janjgir is on NH-149 connecting Raipur and Raigarh on either side. Three-wheeled, black and yellow auto rickshaws, referred to as autos, are a popular form of transport. ERicksaw are easily avaible too. Local transportation also includes man-powered cycle rickshaws. There are regular buses and taxis to all nearby towns and cities. Janjgir aerodrome is Khokhara bhata. It is not served by any scheduled airlines. Janjgir's Bus terminals  are in Naila and bhata para area

Hospitals 
• District Hospital, Janjgir ( including new born baby centre, burn unit, sonography unit, pathology lab, COVID QUARANTINE centre cum treatment centre, vaccination centre)
• Community health Centre Janjgir 
• Dr. Modi Private Hospital
• Mishra Private Hospital
• Ayushmaan Child Care centre cum hospital private
• Dr. Dwivedi Hospital private
• Agrawal Hospital private
• other private hospitals
• many private clinics

near by city's hospitals
• BDM Civil Hospital— Champa
• Mission Hospital Champa
• CHC—Akaltara;

Economy 
There are significant lead deposits in the area of Janjgir. Most of the city's workforce is involved in agriculture or in rice or flour milling. There is also some presence of a chemical industry. latest survey shows presence of Gold, Uranium and crude oil in Janjgir

Industries
 small and medium scale industies for Women's welfare
Atal Thermal power palnt govt.
Rural industrial parks
sponge Iron And Steel Plants
Floor Mills
pulse mills
rice mills
Water Tank Plant
Tasar Cloths
Oil Extraction centre
plastic industries 
Soap and others
KSK Mahanadi power project Nariyara

See also 
Janjgir–Champa
Janjgir Naila
Champa
 Janjgirchampa.nic.in

References

External links 
Official district website

Cities and towns in Janjgir-Champa district